Nyaunglebin is the second largest city in the Nyaunglebin District of Bago Region

Nyaunglebin is not only second largest city of Bago District but also Center City of East Bago Region.
Moreover, fifth largest city of Bago Region. It situated in the middle of East-Bago Region. It far 82 miles from Yangon, 48 miles from Bago, 72 miles from Taungoo, 120 miles from Naypyidaw, 332 miles from Mandalay. Nyaunglebin Township comprises with four towns- Nyaunglebin, Pyuntasa, Madauk, Painzaloke and a lot of villages. Ygn-Mdy Expressway passes through Nyaunglebin town from the west of 15 miles. Nyaunglebin is the intersection of railways and highways. From Nyaunglebin town, there are highway and railway to Shwe Gyin Township. Nyaunglebin Railway Station is an important station for Ygn-Mdy Railway. In 1883, The British Government made the first railway from Yangon to Nyaunglebin for Yangon-Taungoo Section. During the Revolutionary Council government, Nyaunglebin is a zone-city of Bago Region comprising with Kyauktaga(West-Nyaunglebin), Daik-U and Nyaunglebin Townships. In 2022, Sate Administration Council comprised Nyaunglebin District with 5 townships _ Nyaunglebin, Daik-U, Kyauktaga, Shwegyin and Kyaukkyi

References

External links
Satellite map at Maplandia.com

Populated places in Bago Region